The 2009 Richmond Kickers season was their seventeenth season overall and their fourth season in the USL Second Division.

Roster
As of February 24, 2013.

Overall standings

Match results

USL Second Division 
Home team is listed on the left.

Regular season

Playoffs

U.S. Open Cup

International Friendly

See also
Richmond Kickers
2009 in American soccer
2009 U.S. Open Cup

Notes

External links
 Richmond Kickers Official Website

2009
American soccer clubs 2009 season
2009 in sports in Virginia